Kiowa Township may refer to:

In Kansas
 Kiowa Township, Barber County, Kansas
 Kiowa Rural Township, Kiowa County, Kansas

Township name disambiguation pages